Edward John Stanley, 6th Baron Sheffield, 6th Baron Stanley of Alderley, and 5th Baron Eddisbury (October 9, 1907 – March 3, 1971), was a British peer.

He was the son of the Arthur Stanley, 5th Baron Stanley of Alderley (1875–1931) and Margaret Evelyn Gordon (1875–1964). He was educated at Eton and Balliol College, Oxford.

Lord Stanley oversaw the loss of the family's ancestral estate at Alderley Park. With a fondness for gambling, wine and marriage, he had to pay for four divorce settlements, and death duties, even at pre-war levels, for both the 4th and 5th Barons. When the mansion at Alderley Park was destroyed by fire in 1931 he moved into the former farmhouse. When he sold the estate in 1938 to the property developers Hambling Crundall and Co Ltd., many of his older tenants were forced to leave the village.

He had four wives:
 Lady Victoria Audrey Beatrice Chetwynd-Talbot (married 3 March 1932 – divorced 1936)
 Edith Louisa Sylvia Ashley (married 18 January 1944 – divorced 1948)
 Therese Husson (married 6 April 1951 – divorced 1957)
 Kathleen Margaret Crane (née Wright) (married 15 September 1961 – his death 1971). Died 1996.

He and Victoria had one daughter, The Hon. Edwina Maureen Stanley (born 19 January 1933). On his death in 1971, his brother Lyulph Stanley succeeded to his titles, albeit only briefly.

References

1907 births
1971 deaths
People educated at Eton College
Alumni of Balliol College, Oxford
Barons Stanley of Alderley
Barons Sheffield
Eldest sons of British hereditary barons
Edward